Thomas James Delahanty (March 9, 1872 – January 10, 1951) was an American professional baseball infielder, who played in Major League Baseball (MLB) for the Philadelphia Phillies, Cleveland Spiders, Pittsburgh Pirates, and Louisville Colonels, from  to .

He was the second-oldest of the five Delahanty brothers to play in the major leagues.

He is buried at All Souls Cemetery in Sanford, Florida.

References

External links

Tom Delahanty at SABR (Baseball BioProject)
 

1872 births
1951 deaths
19th-century baseball players
Major League Baseball infielders
Philadelphia Phillies players
Cleveland Spiders players
Pittsburgh Pirates players
Louisville Colonels players
Peoria Distillers players
Atlanta Crackers players
Detroit Tigers (Western League) players
Toronto Canadians players
Albany Senators players
Milwaukee Brewers (minor league) players
Kansas City Blues (baseball) players
Newark Colts players
Allentown Peanuts players
Cleveland Lake Shores players
Youngstown Little Giants players
Marion Glass Blowers players
Denver Grizzlies (baseball) players
Columbus Senators players
Wheeling Stogies players
Seattle Siwashes players
Colorado Springs Millionaires players
Pueblo Indians players
Williamsport Millionaires players
Minor league baseball managers
Baseball players from Cleveland